The following lists events that happened during 2014 in Luxembourg.

Incumbents
Monarch: Henri
Prime Minister: Xavier Bettel

Events

June
 18 June - Luxembourg's Chamber of Deputies votes to equalize same-sex marriage and adoption rights from 1 January 2015.

July
 18 July - Espírito Santo Financial Group, the holding company for Portugal's second largest bank, Banco Espírito Santo, files for creditor protection in Luxembourg.

References

 
2010s in Luxembourg
Years of the 21st century in Luxembourg
Luxembourg
Luxembourg